Titchener v British Railway Board [1983] 1 WLR 1427 is a Scottish delict case concerning occupiers' liability, decided by the House of Lords.

Facts
Miss Titchener, a 15-year-old girl, climbed through a gap in a fence onto a railway line owned by the British Railways Board. She was hit by a train. She sued the board under the Occupiers' Liability (Scotland) Act 1960 for failing in their common duty of care to keep the premises reasonably safe for visitors.

The Inner House of the Court of Session held that the pursuer had taken a chance, fully aware of the risks involved and that the Board had no responsibility to maintain the fence any more than they had.

Judgment
The House of Lords dismissed the claimant's final appeal, holding that she was not owed any duty under the Occupiers' Liability (Scotland) Act 1960 on the grounds that she had voluntarily decided to run the risk of walking on the railway line. As such, the defender had no duty, at least in relation to the pursuer, to maintain the fence any better than they had, based on the principle of volenti non fit injuria.

Other cases
The following cases were referred to in this judgment:

 Slater v Clay Cross Co Ltd—distinguished

See also
Tomlinson v Congleton Borough Council
Donoghue v Folkestone Properties Ltd

References

Scottish case law
House of Lords cases
1983 in Scotland
1983 in case law
1983 in British law
Court of Session cases
British Rail
Death in Scotland
Rail transport in Scotland
Delict
Railway litigation in 1983